TAHC may refer to:

 Terrestrial Animal Health Code
 Texas Animal Health Commission